WZMB (91.3 FM) is a radio station  broadcasting an Alternative rock format. Licensed to East Carolina University the station serves the Greenville, North Carolina area.  The station is currently owned by East Carolina University Student Media Board.

Studios 
The WZMB studio facilities are located on the main campus of East Carolina University, in the Mendenhall Student Center Basement.  The current studio has been occupied since 1991.  The previous studio was located in the Old Joyner Library.  WZMB has been on the air since 1982, where it replaced WWWS as the student-run radio station. In 1957 WWWS became a member of the International Goodwill network.

References

External links

ZMB
East Carolina University
Radio stations established in 1957